John P. Miller may refer to:

John P. Miller (naval officer) (fl. 1920s), United States Navy officer and acting Naval Governor of Guam
John Paul Miller (1918–2013), American jewellery designer and goldsmith
John P. Miller (born 1976), birthname of actor and singer Austin Miller
John P. Miller (educator) (fl. 1960s–2000s), Canadian educator

See also
John Miller (disambiguation)